St. Joseph's College for Women, Alappuzha, is a Catholic ladies college in Alappuzha, Kerala, India, affiliated to the University of Kerala. Situated at Convent Square on National Highway 47, it is the first such college in Alappuzha district. The college offers degrees in mathematics, physics, chemistry, botany, zoology, home science, English literature, communicative English, commerce and history, and postgraduate degrees in English language and literature, physics and nutrition and dietetics. Established in 1954,  by the Canossian Daughters of Charity, an international congregation of missionary sisters. It is the only college operated by the Canossian Daughters of Charity. The college offers 10 undergraduate and 3 postgraduate courses and opens up various settings for the understudies in curricular and extra-curricular fields to assist them with remaining admirably in accordance with the vital needs of greatness and worldwide standards. The school was licensed by the National Accreditation and Assessment Council (NAAC) without precedent for 2004 with a commendable B++ (82.5%). In 2013, it was re-certify with an 'A' Grade with a CGPA of 3.13 on a size of four. The school was perceived as a College with Potential for Excellence (CPE) by the UGC in 2016, the main school to be perceived so in the University of Kerala, that year. The best in class lab types of gear supported by DST – FIST, the recently developing Diamond Jubilee Complex lodging the Research Wing, and other advanced and infrastructural augmentations help make the school an academician's center while the worth training classes and the different network administrations embraced by the school, reemphasize the all-inclusive estimations of administration and promise to the network around.

History 
St. Joseph's College for Women was set up in 1954 by the Canossian Daughters of Charity, a global assemblage of preacher sisters. The Canossians are a universal gathering established by St. Magdalene of Canossa, of Verona, Italy, who communicated her conviction that "Instruction is the most requesting segment of the apostolate however it is the best since it regularly decides one's direct of life."

Sri. Chithira Thirunal Balarama Varma, the Rajapramukh of Travancore, established the framework stone on 18 April 1953. The school authoritatively appeared on first July, 1954. Fire up. M. Fernanda Riva was the primary head. The finished school building was authoritatively initiated by Dewan Bahadur Sri. A. Ramaswamy Mudaliar, the Vice Chancellor of the University of Travancore has been bestowing esteem based quality training as one of the well famous Arts and Science Colleges in the region. Managed by the St. Joseph's Canossian Education Society, it maintains the statutes of the heavenly Founder Magdalene of Canossa from Verona, Italy, who held that genuine estimation of training lies in the arrangement of hearts. Consistent with its adage, Virtus et Scientia, (Virtue and Knowledge) the school makes it a point to confer liberal training dependent on common, good and profound standards with a plan to form an accommodating society led by its understudies, a significant number of whom hail from the underestimated areas of the general public, particularly the seaside belt, who leave the entrances as capable and achieved youthful women. To this end, the school keeps up perfect scholarly mood in the grounds giving adequate chances and offices to sustain coordinated characters It is arranged in the heartland of the Alleppey town, which is verifiably eminent on the planet commercial guide for its coir and flavors exchange and now acclaimed as a significant worldwide visitor goal, as the place that is known for pontoon races, backwaters, channels, and lagoons. It has taken into account the reason for ladies' instruction for sixty five long years leaving a permanent engraving in the general public around as a rumored community for advanced education in the territory of Kerala, scaling pinnacles of greatness in both scholastic and extra-curricular fields.

What began as a junior school under the authority of M. Fernanda Riva, the primary principal has crossed the brilliant limit of 50 years in 2004–05. It has now formed into an undeniable school with  undergraduate courses in 10 subjects and postgraduate courses in 3 subjects with a couple of additional in the pipeline, and a few authentication and extra courses offered for the improvement of the students. The school has had the favorable luck to have distinguished Principals including M. Olive Rodrigues, M. Josephine d' Melo, Sr. Olive d' Silva, Dr. Sr. Annette Thottakkara, Dr. Sr. Rose Chacko, Dr. Sr. Annie Mathew, Sr. Leela Mappilacherry and Dr. Sr. Janat Augustine K. Dr. Sheena George expected the initiative of the organization

Vision 
To satisfy the vision of organizer St. Magdalene of Canossa in the development of hearts, they subscribe to frame mentally prepared, ethically upstanding, socially dedicated and profoundly motivated young ladies, particularly the denied and the underestimated, who will viably contribute their offer towards the structure up of a superior society grounded in the estimations of truth and love. They accept it as their bounden obligation to give an engaging domain that realizes the capability of both instructor and student, and to be a change specialist in the public eye and improve the personal satisfaction for all partners through steady quest for greatness

Courses offered

Undergraduate courses

B.Sc.
 B.Sc. Mathematics
 B.Sc. Physics
 B.Sc. Botany
 B.Sc. Zoology
 B.Sc. Chemistry
 B.Sc. Home Science

BA 
 BA History
 BA English Language and Literature
 BA English and Communicative English

B.Com.

Postgraduate courses 
 MA English Language and Literature
 M Sc. Physics
 M Sc. Nutrition and Dietics

Governing body 
St. Joseph's College for Women takes into account around 1275 understudies with the help of around 62 school personnel including perpetual workforce and visitor personnel and 22 non-educating staff. Among the school personnel, about 40% have Ph.D. also, a large portion of the rest have M. Phil. as their most elevated degree while a few are occupied with the way toward getting their doctorate. Several individuals from the staff are occupied with remotely supported research ventures while a few have finished activities.

The college was granted B++ Grade with a CGPA of 2.87 on a size of four in the third NAAC accreditation process led in 2018. The college has had the option to join the fundamental beliefs of advanced education maintained by the Higher Educational Council and NAAC with its own vision and crucial originate from the instructive arrangement developed by the Canossian Congregation, guided by the statutes of St. Magdalene of Canossa, the originator of the request, along these lines guaranteeing esteem based instruction that goes for worldwide skills.

The college has gained impressive ground scholastically and in the refreshing of its framework offices, while proceeding to make its essence felt in the co-curricular and extra-curricular situation. The Diamond Jubilee square lodging a hall, small scale theater, inquire about labs, homerooms and a storm cellar vehicle leave is approaching culmination. In 2015, the College was the beneficiary of award from DST FIST for the infrastructural improvement of Science labs. In 2016, the College was conceded the status of "College With Potential for Excellence" (CPE) by UGC, the main school to be allowed it that year among schools under the University of Kerala.

The college is the focal point of numerous significant socio-social occasions in Alleppey. The augmentation exercises attempted by the different associations in the school including the NSS, the NCC, Women's Study Unit, AICUF and Jesus Youth, have had the expansive effect on the network around. The graduated class of the school have exceeded expectations in assorted circles as confirm by their achievement in their individual fields.

Facilities

Hostel 
The college hostel gives convenience to around 150 students. Those looking for admission to the college hostel will present the application in the recommended application structure accessible at the hostel office to the superintendent at the hour of affirmation. Admission to the hostel is made simply after admission to the college. Just on the settlement of expenses and stores recommended, will an understudy be considered and admitted to the inn. Enlisted as an individual from the hostel, the understudy is put under the consideration of the warden and will be bound by the principles of the inn. Understudies not living with their folks are required to remain in the college hostel  affirmed by the Principal. Change of habitation of the student ought to be appropriately answered to the head.

Computer lab 
There are two well-prepared computer labs for scholarly exercises just as leading course and preparing programs. It is a Cyber focus too. Instructors and understudies of this school can profit themselves of the web and email offices here. Computer proficiency programs for staff and understudies and different IT courses are advertised. It is glared in such a way, that it can meet the new advancements in the data world.

Placement 
St. Joseph's College for Women is providing ample opportunities to its students in attaining their career goal. The Placement Cell plays a crucial role in the overall personality development of students through several life skills and soft skills workshops, seminars and communication workshops. The center gives orientation and guidance for preparing various competitive examinations like UGC/CSIR, Bank tests, PSC exams, Civil Service etc.

Departments

Department of Botany 
The Department was built up in 1956. It offers B.Sc. Botany course and Horticulture as the open course.

The department keeps up a professional flowerbed. There are two well-prepared down-to-earth labs. There is a well-working biotechnology look into lab.

Department of Chemistry 
"Intelligence and Character"

Branch of Chemistry is one of the lively divisions in St. Joseph's College for Women, Alappuzha, arranged in Block B of the College. the Department of Chemistry was set up in 1954. Mrs. Saraswathy Nair and Sr. Genevieve D'silva were the educating workforce. B.Sc. Science was begun in 1957. the primary cluster of B.Sc. Science understudies turned out effectively in 1960. The office has best in class infrastructural offices regarding admirably outfitted research facilities with present-day instruments and all around outfitted and roomy homerooms. the office takes into account one principle and four reciprocal college understudies. The year 1998-99 saw the commencement of UGC supported occupation arranged degree course for clinical nourishment and dietetics, science as one of the fundamental subject.

"We endeavor to contact the flawlessness through a sincere scholarly interest for 'Information' and our endeavors bloom into 'Ideals' through our imaginative and empathetic inclusion in the general public to change it"At present the office well furnished with youthful and gifted educators who endeavor to get flawlessness everything. The office was supported by DST-FIST. The well prepared research lab gave us the open door for the asset preparation for the exploration. Division offers different testament courses to enhance the educational program to be specific 'Instrumentation and Analytical Techniques', 'Commencement to Innovation' and 'Prologue to virtual products for science' for understudies to improve their vocation competency. Additionally Department centers around the character development of the principal year understudies by giving them a Skill Development Program.

Department of Commerce 
Commerce was presented as a subject of concentrate at the Pre-Degree level in 1984. Smt. A. Mary Helen was named as educating staff. Be that as it may, the Department of Commerce was set up in the year 1989. Smt Rita Latha D'couto was named. A significant achievement throughout the entire existence of the Department was the presentation of the B. Com Degree Course in the year 1995, because of the untiring and proactive endeavors of Rev. Sr. Dr. Annette Thottakkara, Principal. As of now, two additional options were made to the showing workforce, Smt. Suleena V.S. what's more, Smt. Jini Mathew. Smt. A. Mary Helen resigned in March 2003, and Smt. Rita Latha D'couto accepted charge as the Head of the Department. From its commencement, the Department of Commerce has been dynamic in starting various inventive exercises for expanding the employability and aggressiveness of understudies, advancing their insight and aptitudes in territories past the recommended educational program, advancing social and natural activism among the understudies and offering some incentive expansion to their grounds encounters.

Department of English 
The PG Department of English in St. Joseph's College for Women was built up at the commencement of the school, on first July 1954. It began working initially to take into account the middle of the road/Pre-certificate level understudies, and for the General English understudies at the Degree level. In 1971, it made its mark when the Under Graduate Course in English Language and Literature was introduced. The first since forever Post Graduate Course in the school was begun in English Language and Literature in 1999. In 2014, another Career Related college class in English and Communicative English was started to take into account the changing occasions and needs. The Department has been bestowing quality training for over six decades and is the greatest office in the college. It contacts all surges of study, in this manner setting itself in a powerful position, fit for trim every one of the understudies under its umbrella.

Department of History 
The division of History frames a fundamental piece of the sociologies stream of the College. The division of history bears most seasoned conventions of advanced education in the province of Kerala. It was begun in 1956 as an UG program with an enlistment of 6 understudies under the direction of Rev. Mother Fernanda, the primary principal and HOD of History. Presently there are 210 understudies for the course. It has had on its staff veteran teachers, some of whom who had exceeded expectations as effective principals. Besides Rev. Mother Fernanda, different individuals from the personnel were Sr. Zinha, Prof. Eunice George, Prof. Rosamma Joseph and Prof. Juliet Stephen. Prof. Daisy Soman, Prof. Mariamma Francis and Dr. Sr. Annette joined the office during the 1960s. Mrs. Geetha, Mrs. Vimala Menon, Mrs. Padma Sankar, Mrs. Clara Simon, Mrs. Cheerful Raju, Mrs. Agnes Christy and Mrs. Indu Rajasekhar joined the division later. Mrs Sandya A K is the present leader of the office and Dr. Santhi Jose, Miss Meenu Tresa Joseph and Miss Sreekutty Selvaraj are the visitor resources.

The division urges its understudies to effectively take part in network exercises and attempts to use its understudy quality for formative programs. Organizing workshops for the students, arranging instructive visits to spots of verifiable importance, celebrating long periods of national and worldwide significance have become normal highlights. Consistently the office composes exhibitions, intercollegiate oration and test competitionsThe Department Museum has a decent assortment of stamps, coins, paper-cuttings and models which establish the wellspring of data for the investigation. Historia, the Association of the understudies of History, is lively going about as a reactant operator in drawing out the inactive gifts of our understudies'.

Department of Zoology 
The Department of Zoology was built up in 1959. Prof. Marykutty George was the principal leader of the office. The Department of Zoology advances revelation and learning at all degrees of natural association (atomic, cell, organismal, populace, network, and environment) and is a DST-FIST supported division. Their integrative center mirrors the significance of solid disciplinary and interdisciplinary methodologies in educating. They take a stab at greatness and cooperative energy in their organized projects of educating and administration. Perceiving the basic jobs of science and science in the lives of residents today and tomorrow, they stress organic proficiency in their educating and effort programs. Alongside the subject information they target instilling profound and social qualities in the understudies.

Recent activity

They Invited E Kunhikrishnan, Environmentalist, for a discussion on the topic "Biodiversity Conservation in Western Ghats" on 5 October 2019.

Department of Physics 
Division of Physics was set up as the absolute starting point of  the institution. In 1966 the Degree course in Physics was begun and In 2001 Post Graduation. The first Head of the Department, Prof. Chandrika Devi  was a fine mix of effortlessness, sincerity and commitment. She resigned in 1990, leaving the seat open to experienced staff, and the office was fortunate to participate in the administrations of recognized teachers  –Prof. Tresa Panjikkaran, Prof. Leelamma Joseph, Prof. Elsamma Job, Prof. Lylamma Scaria, Prof. Mariamma Joseph, Prof. Sreedevi P, Prof. Sophiamma Joseph,  Dr. Ancy Manuel, Dr. Jesintha John C. and  Dr. Lusamma Joseph.

Dr. Rose Leena Thomas is the leader of the office from 2019 to 2020. Every one of the educators of the office are focused on the assignment of not mere teaching and educational program yet have been and still are eager to walk the additional mile for the general improvement of the students, molding them into ethically upstanding and socially dedicated people.

College Library 
St. Joseph's College Library is mechanized utilizing full highlighted open-source Integrated Library System KOHA and is well outfitted with around 47,700 books and 75 periodicals spread over practically every one of the orders. Through WEBOPAC Library index can be gotten to on the web. Library has a system place for web search and computerized library get to, furnished with PCs with web office of data transfer capacity 10Mbit/s gave as a feature of NMEICT. Library additionally keeps up unique assortment of 'works by Canossian Sisters of Charity', 'Stroll With a Scholar' and 'Researcher Support Program'. Library buys in to N-LIST database gave by UGC-INFLIBNET since 2010. "Yearly Best User" grant is given to the best friendly understudy each year who utilizes the library assets. Dspace and can be gotten to just inside the grounds, it is a created computerized library.

Notable alumni
 Mini Antony, IAS officer.
 Devi Chandana, dancer and cine artiste
 Jalaja, Malayalam actress
 Saranya Mohan, actress
 M. Margaret Peter, former mother general of the Canossian Congregation

References

External links
 http://www.stjosephscollegeforwomen.org/ 

Catholic universities and colleges in India
Women's universities and colleges in Kerala
Colleges in Kerala
Universities and colleges in Alappuzha district
Educational institutions established in 1954
1954 establishments in India
Arts and Science colleges in Kerala
Colleges affiliated to the University of Kerala